Axler is a surname. Notable people with the surname include:

Rachel Axler, American screenwriter and playwright
Sheldon Axler (born 1949), American mathematician

See also
James Axler, pen-name of multiple action-adventure writers